The Stiefel Theatre (originally the Fox–Watson Theater) is in Salina, Kansas. Opened in 1931, it was listed on the National Register of Historic Places in 1988 as the "Fox–Watson Theater Building".

History 

The Fox–Watson Theatre was opened in late February 1931 by Winfield W. Watson, a local businessman and banker. He led the campaign and donated the land, to bring a movie house to Salina. Boller Brothers, an architectural firm out of Kansas City, Missouri, designed the structure.

The opening feature was Not Exactly Gentlemen featuring Fay Wray.  The theater was closed in August 1987 by then owners Dickinson Theaters, because competition from Dickinson's mall theaters made the downtown location unprofitable.

Dickinson gave the theater to the city in 1989.  It was restored by a non-profit group over several years and reopened as The Stiefel Theatre for the Performing Arts on March 8, 2003.

Its mission is to "enrich, educate and entertain", and the programming goal is to "offer a broad base of quality entertainment in a variety of genres that will appeal to a large demographic". It houses the Salina Symphony.

References

Theatres completed in 1931
Art Deco architecture in Kansas
Buildings and structures in Saline County, Kansas
Salina, Kansas
Tourist attractions in Saline County, Kansas
Theatres in Kansas
Theatres on the National Register of Historic Places in Kansas
National Register of Historic Places in Saline County, Kansas